The Philippines national dragon boat team is the national dragon boat team of the Philippines and represents the country in international dragon boat. There is an ongoing dispute between the Philippine Dragon Boat Federation and the Philippine Canoe-Kayak Dragon Boat Federation over which is the sole legitimate sporting body over the national dragon boat team. Philippine Dragon Boat Federation is a member of the International Dragon Boat Federation while the Philippine Canoe-Kayak Dragon Boat Federation is the recognized by the Philippine Olympic Committee. However, the Court of Arbitration for Sport (CAS) have stated that as a Full Member of Sportaccord (the World Union of International Federations) the IDBF is the only recognized world governing body for Dragon Boating. Therefore, de facto the IDBF Members are the National Governing Bodies for Dragon Boating in their own Countries. The two organizations field their own dragon boat teams.

Tournament records

International Dragon Boat Federation tournaments
All tournaments organized by the International Dragon Boat Federation (IDBF) was represented by the national team fielded by the Philippine Dragon Boat Federation.

IDBF World Championships

IDBF World Cup

IDBF Asian Championships

International Canoe Federation tournaments
All tournaments organized by the International Canoe Federation (ICF) was represented by a Dragon Boat Team fielded by the Philippine Canoe Kayak Federation.

ICF World Championships

ICF Asian Championships

Asian Games

External links
Philippine Dragon Boat Federation

References

Dragon Boat
Dragon boat racing in the Philippines